Norway 1941 was a battle honour awarded to units of the British and Imperial Armies that took part in one or more of the following operations in the Second World War:
Operation Claymore
Operation Gauntlet
Operation Archery

References

Battle honours of the British Army